Wicklund is a surname. Notable people with the surname include:

Arne H. Wicklund (1926–1990), American businessman, lawyer, jurist and legislator
Erling Wicklund (born 1944), Norwegian jazz musician
Ottar Wicklund (1911–1978), Norwegian actor
Susan Wicklund (born 1954), American abortion provider